CDK is a library written in C that provides a collection of widgets for text user interfaces (TUI) development. The widgets wrap ncurses functionality to make writing full screen curses programs faster. Perl and Python bindings are also available.

There are two versions of the library. It was originally written by Mike Glover, introduced as version 4.6 in comp.sources.unix. The other version was extended beginning in May 1999 by Thomas Dickey.

Programs that use CDK
 Password Management System A console based password management program

See also
 Dialog (software)

References

External links
 

Application programming interfaces
Software that uses ncurses
Software using the BSD license
Text user interface libraries
Widget toolkits